The Waterfront and Allied Workers' Union (WAWU) is a trade union in Dominica.  It is affiliated with the International Trade Union Confederation.

References

Trade unions in Dominica
International Trade Union Confederation
Port workers' trade unions